The 1983 Men's Junior World Handball Championship was the fourth edition of the IHF Men's Junior World Championship, held in Finland from 3 to 12 December 1983.

Preliminary round

Group A

Group B

Group C

Group D

Main round
All points and goals against the team from the same preliminary round were carried over.

9–16th place classification

Group III

Group IV

1st–8th place classification

Group I

Group II

Placement games

15th place game

13th place game

Eleventh place game

Ninth place game

Seventh place game

Fifth place game

Third place game

Final

Final ranking

External links
IHF report
Results on todor66.com

1983 Junior
Men's Junior World Handball Championship
International sports competitions hosted by Finland
1983 in Finnish sport
December 1983 sports events in Europe